Jordan C. Wells (October 20, 1861 – February 8, 1946) was an American football player and coach.  He served as the head football coach at Syracuse University for one season in 1892, compiling a record of 0–8–1. He was the third head coach of the Syracuse football team and failed to win a single game.  Wells attended Wesleyan University, where he played football, serving as the team's captain in 1886.

Head coaching record

References

External links
 

1861 births
1946 deaths
19th-century players of American football
Canadian players of American football
Syracuse Orange football coaches
Wesleyan Cardinals football players
Newfoundland Colony people
Gridiron football people from Newfoundland and Labrador